Santa Rosa de Aguán is a municipality in the Honduran department of Colón.

It was affected by Hurricane Mitch.

References

Municipalities of the Colón Department (Honduras)